The 2017 Rostelecom Cup was the first event of six in the 2017–18 ISU Grand Prix of Figure Skating, a senior-level international invitational competition series. It was held at the Megasport Arena in Moscow on October 20–22. Medals were awarded in the disciplines of men's singles, ladies' singles, pair skating, and ice dance. Skaters earned points toward qualifying for the 2017–18 Grand Prix Final.

Entries 
The ISU published the preliminary assignments on May 26, 2017.

Changes to preliminary assignments

Results

Men

Ladies

Pairs

Ice dance

References

Citations

External links 
 2017 Rostelecom Cup at the International Skating Union

Rostelecom Cup
Rostelecom Cup
Rostelecom Cup
Rostelecom Cup